Dilochrosis is a genus of beetles  belonging to the family Scarabaeidae, subfamily Cetoniinae.

List of Species
 Dilochrosis atripennis (MacLeay, 1863)
 Dilochrosis bakewellii (White, 1859)
 Dilochrosis balteata (Vollenhoven, 1871)
 Dilochrosis brownii (Kirby, 1818)
 Dilochrosis rufolatera Lea, 1914
 Dilochrosis walteri Lea, 1914

References
  Biolib

Cetoniinae